is a Japanese professional baseball infielder for the Hiroshima Toyo Carp in Japan's Nippon Professional Baseball.

External links

NPB.com

1993 births
Living people
Baseball people from Kitakyushu
Japanese baseball players
Nippon Professional Baseball infielders
Tohoku Rakuten Golden Eagles players
Hiroshima Toyo Carp players